Perpolita hammonis is a species of air-breathing land snail, a terrestrial pulmonate gastropod mollusk in the family Gastrodontidae.

Distribution
This species is known to occur in a number of countries and islands including:

 Czech Republic
 Ukraine
 Great Britain
 Ireland
Malaysia
 and other areas

Description 
Perpolita hammonis has a light brown shell with about 3.5 whorls. The shell is shiny with characteristic regular, radial lines. These help as well to distinguish young N. hammonis from other young snails of the families Oxychilidae and Gastrodontidae.

The 1.9-2.1 x 3.6-4.1 mm shell has 3-3.5 whorls. These are usually reddish brown, with regular radial riblets (9-14 riblets/mm).The umbilicus is open and not deep, and slightly excentric at the last whorl. Fresh shells have very faintly visible spiral lines under high magnification, about 10 spiral lines per radial riblet, 100-150 lines/mm.The animal is slender and blackish. The tentacles are black. The foot is narrow, and grey in colour with blackish upper sides and black spots on the sides. The mantle is light grey.

Habitat
The species can live in a wide range of habitats with dry to humid conditions. It can as well tolerate acidic soils. Nesiovitrea hammonis can live in open sites, like meadows, but it generally occurs in wooded habitats and is often found in beech forests.

References 

 Bank, R. A.; Neubert, E. (2017). Checklist of the land and freshwater Gastropoda of Europe. Last update: July 16th, 2017.
 Sysoev, A. V. & Schileyko, A. A. (2009). Land snails and slugs of Russia and adjacent countries. Sofia/Moskva (Pensoft). 312 pp., 142 plates

External links
 Alder, J. (1830). A catalogue of the land and fresh-water testaceous Mollusca found in the vicinity of Newcastle upon Tyne, with remarks. Transactions of the Natural History Society of Northumberland and Durham. 1(1): 26-41
 Schileyko, A. A. & Rymzhanov, T. S. (2013). Fauna of land mollusks (Gastropoda, Pulmonata Terrestria) of Kazakhstan and adjacent territories. Moscow-Almaty: KMK Scientific Press. 389 pp.

Gastrodontidae
Gastropods described in 1765
Taxa named by Hans Strøm